Donald Ray Davis (born Oklahoma City, 28 March 1934) is an American entomologist, specializing in Lepidoptera.

Biography 
In 1956 Davis earned his bachelor's degree in Entomology at the University of Kansas.  He received  his Ph.D. at Cornell University in 1962.

Since 1961 Davis has been a research entomologist in microlepidoptera for the Smithsonian Institution.

The Lepidopterists' Society awarded him its Karl Jordan Medal in 1977 for his work on the Prodoxidae.

References

External links 

 Tree of Life Web Project

Living people
American lepidopterists
Taxon authorities
21st-century American biologists
21st-century American zoologists
Smithsonian Institution people
1934 births
University of Kansas alumni
Cornell University alumni
Smithsonian Institution affiliates
People from Oklahoma City